Rural Party is a political party of Iceland. It was founded on 23 February 2013 with the aim of working for the interests of the rural population, which the founders felt had been neglected by other parties. The party is no longer active, but has not been formally dissolved.

References

Defunct political parties in Iceland
2013 establishments in Iceland
Nordic agrarian parties
Political parties established in 2013